Alfredo Palma (born 16 July 1955) is a Nicaraguan weightlifter. He competed in the men's featherweight event at the 1984 Summer Olympics.

References

External links
 

1955 births
Living people
Nicaraguan male weightlifters
Olympic weightlifters of Nicaragua
Weightlifters at the 1984 Summer Olympics
Place of birth missing (living people)